Government Saiha College is the only college in Saiha district of  Mizoram, northeast India. It is the first college in southern Mizoram. It was established in 1978 as a result of public demand, and recognised by the Government of Mizoram in 1979. It started as only arts college. It is now under the jurisdiction of the Mizoram University and under recognition of the University Grants Commission (India).

Under governmental organisation of Mizoram, it operates as a branch of the Mizoram College Teachers' Association.

History 

The demand for an institute of higher education in Chhimtuipui district (from which Saiha district would later split up) emerged in 1974. In June 1974, a demand committee was organised under the chair of K. Paichho, the then Executive Member of Mara Autonomous District Council. However, financial constraint prevented immediate action. By public pressure, Saiha College was inaugurated on 20 July 1978 with only a pre-university course. The Government of Mizoram sanctioned permission/recognition the next year, on 2 November 1979. It received affiliation from North Eastern Hill University, Shillong, in 1980. Bachelor's degree course was started in 1980, and was recognised by the university in 1984. Science subject was introduced in 1988. Honours degree subjects were initiated in 1986 in political science and history. The college was upgraded to the status of deficit grant-in-aid system under the state government in 1985. It became a full-fledged government college in 1992. NEHU issued permanent affiliation in 1995. Affiliation was transferred to Mizoram University, when the university was created in 2001.

Infrastructure

The college campus with an area of 6.5 ha (5.6 in revenue measurement) was allocated by the Mara Autonomous District Council on 14 February 1984. The college has buildings for classrooms (separate for arts and science), office, girls' hostel, library, laboratory, students' common room, parking lot, canteen and staff quarters. There is a regular servicing college bus.

Departments
Department of English 
Department of History 
Department of Education 
Department of Political Science 
Department of Economics
Department of Sociology
Department of Mizo

Distance learning

Government Saiha College offers postgraduate courses in public administration, economics, political science, sociology, and English, though IGNOU.

See also
Education in India
Education in Mizoram
Mizoram University
Literacy in India

References

External links
 

Universities and colleges in Mizoram
Colleges affiliated to Mizoram University